Oleksandr Zghura (born 20 August 1985, in Odessa, in the Ukrainian SSR of the Soviet Union) is a Ukrainian footballer currently under contract for FC Kyzylzhar in the Kazakhstan First Division.

External links
Profile at FFU website
Profile at fcdacia.md

1985 births
Living people
Ukrainian footballers
Ukrainian expatriate footballers
Expatriate footballers in Moldova
Expatriate footballers in Kazakhstan
Association football forwards
FC Chornomorets Odesa players
FC Zirka Kropyvnytskyi players
FC Dacia Chișinău players
FC Hoverla Uzhhorod players
FC Prykarpattia Ivano-Frankivsk (2004) players
FC Vostok players
Ukrainian expatriate sportspeople in Moldova
Ukrainian expatriate sportspeople in Kazakhstan
Footballers from Odesa